Claudio Forrosuelo was a Philippine Army enlisted trooper and a posthumous recipient of the Philippines' highest military award for courage, the Medal of Valor.

Action against Moro secessionists

Sergeant Forrosuelo was a member of the 8th Scout Ranger Company of the Philippine Army which saw combat during the 6-month campaign of the Armed Forces of the Philippines against the secessionist Moro Islamic Liberation Front in 2000. Forrosuelo's 80-man unit engaged a force of MILF rebels numbering approximately 500 fighters in Matanog, Maguindanao on 3 May 2000.

Pinned down by enemy fire and incurring numerous casualties, the government security forces were almost out-flanked. Forrosuelo led an assault on the well-entrenched MILF forces that allowed the evacuation of the wounded soldiers. He then elected to stay behind and along with five others, delayed the enemy counter-attack. He was killed in action. Forrosuelo was conferred the Medal of Valor in 2001.

Medal of Valor citation

"For acts of conspicuous courage, gallantry and intrepidity above and beyond the call of duty while serving as member of the 8th Scout Ranger Company, 2nd Scout Ranger Battalion, 1st Scout Ranger Regiment, Special Operations Command, Philippine Army during an encounter with more or less 500 Moro Islamic Liberation Front rebels at vicinity of Matanog, Maguindanao on or about 030530 May 2000.

Aware of the overwhelming number of the enemy, lack of close air support and possible reinforcements and considering that all other operating units are likewise heavily engaged with the enemy forces, his platoon fiercely engaged the enemies. Outnumbered and outgunned by a numerically superior forces occupying a well-entrenched, fortified and reinforced concrete bunkers, the operating troops were pinned down in their positions. As a result, the government troops suffered a considerable number of casualties to include 37 wounded.
Sensing the superiority of the enemies who were on the verge of out flanking the troops, he led the team of his company to a daring and decisive tactical assault on the well entrenched enemy position in order to ease the pressure from the troops and allow them to extricate their wounded comrades. While leading the most forward element of the Battalion, he courageously held the ground and fought the enemy along with other members of his platoon in a close battle while providing accurate cover fires in order to prevent the enemy from enveloping the troops. During the fierce encounter, the enemy sustained more casualties than the government troops. However, the courage and valor of SERGEANT FORRUSUELO is not measured by the number of enemies killed and wounded alone, but rather by the number of his fellow soldier he saved.

By this display of heroism and selflessness in the highest order, giving up his life so that others may live, SERGEANT FORRUSUELO had incomparably distinguished himself in combat which is in keeping with the finest tradition of Filipino soldier."

Personal life
Sergeant Forrosuelo's youngest child Precious Jewel Forrosuelo was 8 years old at the time of his death. She graduated from the Philippine Military Academy in March 2014, making history as the first ever offspring of a Medal of Valor awardee to graduate from the PMA. A week after her graduation, she was commissioned a Second Lieutenant in the Philippine Army.

Commemoration
In August 2016, the legislative body of Tagum, Davao del Norte, Forrosuelo's birthplace, adopted a resolution granting him a posthumous award for the same actions that earned him the Medal of Valor.

References

Armed Forces of the Philippines Medal of Valor
Recipients of the Philippine Medal of Valor
Philippine Army personnel
2000 deaths